The Cosmopolitans was a United States new wave band that was based in New York from 1979 until 82. The band was best known for songs "(How to Keep Your) Husband Happy" and "Wild Moose Party" released on Alan Betrock's Shake Records in 1980 (USA), and Albion Records in 1981 (UK). Characterized by its quirky choreography and lyrics, songs were often based on tabloid news stories. Shows often included 1960's go-go dance lessons, Wild Moose-call contests, baton routines, and chartreuse fake furs worn over blue mini-skirts.

History

The Cosmopolitans' origins date back to University of North Carolina at Chapel Hill as "the North Carolina Progressive Dance Troop". In 1977, Jamie K. Sims and Nel Moore moved to New York City. The two often go-go danced onstage with rock-scene friends the dB's and the Fleshtones. They also hosted 60’s go-go dance lessons at Club 57, teaching New York downtown hipsters retro dance moves like the Jerk, the Watusi, and the Boogaloo.

On May 6, 1979, a benefit concert was thrown for the struggling dance group at CBGB. The bill included Monster Masher Bobby Pickett, The dB's, the Fleshtones, Information, and Big Help. At the show's end the Cosmopolitan Dance Troop performed one of their own satirical pop song and dance numbers. It was a hit with the new wave crowd. Sims shortened their name to the Cosmopolitans, and from then on began booking them at rock clubs instead of theaters.

By 1980 the boys were out of the group and the Cosmopolitans were an all-girl threesome of Jamie K. Sims, Nel Moore, and Leslie Levinson. They performed Sims's songs and an assortment of covers to prerecorded backing tracks. These tracks were recorded by Sims on keyboards and fellow North Carolina musicians Mitch Easter and Chris Stamey on drums and guitars. During live performances Will Rigby often sat in on drums to augment the taped tracks. Levinson left later that year, and the Cosmopolitans forged on as a duo.

In the summer of 1980, Sims and Moore traveled down to Easter’s Drive-In Studio (in Winston-Salem, NC) to record a booking demo of three of Sims’s songs. Easter and Sims produced the session, with Easter also adding drums and guitar to Sims’s keyboards, vocals, and harmonica, and Moore’s harmonica and vocals. Back in New York, Alan Betrock was taken with what he heard and released the tracks on his Shake Records label in October 1980. “(How to Keep Your) Husband Happy” and “Wild Moose Party”  and dance-club hits and was played on New York rock station WNEW-FM. The songs were later released on the Shake to Date compilation LP. In 1981 Albion Records released the single “Husband Happy” in the U.K. backed with a new tune, “Chevy Baby.” "Wild Moose Party" was written to honor Sims's 22-pound cat. "(How To Keep Your) Husband Happy" referenced an exercise record that was owned by Sims's mother, that was released by Debbie Drake, a popular late 1950s television personality and fitness promoter.

A short time after the Shake Records release, additional musicians were added and the Cosmopolitans evolved into a tape-free live band. Sims and Moore fronted the group with vocals, percussion, and choreography. Sims often added Ace Tone organ solos with Moore wailing on harmonica. The longest-lived lineup of live Cosmopolitans included drummer Evan "Funk" Davies, guitarist David Itch, and keyboardist Jeff Dedrick. Robert Crenshaw stepped in as drummer in late 1981. Moore left the group in 1982, and the final touring band featured Sims, Itch, Neil Winograd on drums, and Judy Monteleone on guitar. The group performed at some of New York's most high-profile rock clubs - including Hurrah, Max's Kansas City, the Mudd Club, CBGB, the Ritz, the original Peppermint Lounge, and Irving Plaza - and toured up and down the East Coast.
 
Sims disbanded the group in November 1982 when she contracted Epstein-Barr virus.

In November 2003 Lee Joseph, of Dionysus Records, contacted Sims about releasing a Cosmopolitans retrospective CD, including unreleased studio and live tapes, plus the original Shake recordings of “Wild Moose Party,” “(How to Keep Your) Husband Happy”, and “Dancin’ Lesson.”  During the dig for old tapes, a pre-MTV video of “Husband Happy,” directed by Michael Dugan, was also unearthed. The video includes band footage of their appearance on the Uncle Floyd Show, as well as the Husband Happy tips acted out by Faye Hunter, Mitch Easter, Rayna, Sims, and Moore. This  enhanced CD, titled Wild Moose Party – New Wave Pom Pom Girls Gone Go-Go, NYC 1980-1981, was released in 2006 on the Bacchus Archives label.

The Cosmopolitans played a reunion concert on August 2, 2009 at Cat's Cradle, Carrboro, N.C., their first concert in 27 years. Don Dixon and Mitch Easter sat in with the group and also performed solo sets. Evan "Funk" Davies played drums, Nel Moore Nichols played harmonica and sang, Jamie K. Sims provided lead vocals and played tambourine and toys. Don Dixon played bass. On "Rockin' Doctors" Thad Williamson performed on trombone and Mac Smith played the guitar solo. On "(How to Keep Your) Husband Happy" Mitch Easter played lead guitar. David "Itch" Britsch was unable to perform at the concert and Jamie K. Sims's brother, Corey Sims, played guitar and provided back-up vocals. Judy Monteleone was also unable to make the reunion, and Catherine (Cathy) Harrington played keyboards and also added vocals.

In March 2017 guitarist David "Itch" Britsch passed away. In May 2017 Judy Monteleone, Nel Moore's substitute during the final months of the group, died.

References

External links 
 Morning music, The Cosmopolitans, “(How to Keep Your) Husband Happy”

American new wave musical groups
Musical groups established in 1979
Musical groups disestablished in 1982